Bhathihan Bazar is one of the main bazar  of Sabaila municipality in Dhanusa District of Province No. 2 of Nepal. Bhathihan Bazar was central village of Satoshar V.D.C., where the V.D.C. office was established. During the new law process of Nepal, this village lies under the Sabaila Municipality, Dhanusa.

Schools
Shree Jan-chetna primary School
Happy Land English Boarding School
New Star English Boarding School
Shree Ram janaki higher secondary school and college
Royal Dhanusha boarding school

References

External links
"Nepal Census 2001"
 http://sabailamun.gov.np/
 UN map of the municipalities of Dhanusa District

Populated places in Dhanusha District